The Sochi constituency (No.50) is a Russian legislative constituency in Krasnodar Krai. In 1993-2003 Krasnodar Krai had 7 constituencies but population growth along the Black Sea coast resulted in Krai getting 8th district, based around Sochi, which was previously a part of Tuapse constituency.

Members elected

Election results

2003

|-
! colspan=2 style="background-color:#E9E9E9;text-align:left;vertical-align:top;" |Candidate
! style="background-color:#E9E9E9;text-align:left;vertical-align:top;" |Party
! style="background-color:#E9E9E9;text-align:right;" |Votes
! style="background-color:#E9E9E9;text-align:right;" |%
|-
|style="background-color:"|
|align=left|Vitaly Sevastyanov
|align=left|Communist Party
|
|18.71%
|-
|style="background-color:"|
|align=left|Nikolay Khoroshilov
|align=left|Independent
|
|15.80%
|-
|style="background-color:"|
|align=left|Vasily Teterin
|align=left|United Russia
|
|14.51%
|-
|style="background-color:#00A1FF"|
|align=left|Aleksey Andreyev
|align=left|Party of Russia's Rebirth-Russian Party of Life
|
|10.19%
|-
|style="background-color:"|
|align=left|Leonid Teleleyko
|align=left|Yabloko
|
|8.11%
|-
|style="background-color:"|
|align=left|Yevgeny Bagishvili
|align=left|Liberal Democratic Party
|
|3.72%
|-
|style="background-color:"|
|align=left|Sergey Kozaderov
|align=left|Agrarian Party
|
|2.47%
|-
|style="background-color:"|
|align=left|Vitaly Polessky
|align=left|Independent
|
|1.64%
|-
|style="background-color:#164C8C"|
|align=left|Nikolay Petrov
|align=left|United Russian Party Rus'
|
|1.56%
|-
|style="background-color:#000000"|
|colspan=2 |against all
|
|18.42%
|-
| colspan="5" style="background-color:#E9E9E9;"|
|- style="font-weight:bold"
| colspan="3" style="text-align:left;" | Total
| 
| 100%
|-
| colspan="5" style="background-color:#E9E9E9;"|
|- style="font-weight:bold"
| colspan="4" |Source:
|
|}

2016

|-
! colspan=2 style="background-color:#E9E9E9;text-align:left;vertical-align:top;" |Candidate
! style="background-color:#E9E9E9;text-align:left;vertical-align:top;" |Party
! style="background-color:#E9E9E9;text-align:right;" |Votes
! style="background-color:#E9E9E9;text-align:right;" |%
|-
|style="background-color: " |
|align=left|Konstantin Zatulin
|align=left|United Russia
|138,232
|  61.89% 
|-
|style="background-color: " |
|align=left|Igor Vasilyev
|align=left|Communist Party
|27,242
|12.20%
|-
|style="background-color: " |
|align=left|Tatyana Seredenko
|align=left|Liberal Democratic Party
|15,648
|7.01%
|-
|style="background-color: " |
|align=left|Sergey Badyuk
|align=left|Rodina
|8,875
|3.97%
|-
|style="background:"| 
|align=left|Dmitry Novikov
|align=left|The Greens
|8,014
|3.59%
|-
|style="background-color: " |
|align=left|Igor Torosyan
|align=left|A Just Russia
|7,551
|3.38%
|-
|style="background-color: " |
|align=left|Svetlana Nezhelskaya
|align=left|Patriots of Russia
|4,495
|2.01%
|-
|style="background:"| 
|align=left|Taras Yarosh
|align=left|Party of Growth
|4,137
|1.85%
|-
|style="background:"| 
|align=left|Anton Khasanov
|align=left|Communists of Russia
|3,426
|1.53%
|-
| colspan="5" style="background-color:#E9E9E9;"|
|- style="font-weight:bold"
| colspan="3" style="text-align:left;" | Total
| 223,256
| 100%
|-
| colspan="5" style="background-color:#E9E9E9;"|
|- style="font-weight:bold"
| colspan="4" |Source:
|
|}

2021

|-
! colspan=2 style="background-color:#E9E9E9;text-align:left;vertical-align:top;" |Candidate
! style="background-color:#E9E9E9;text-align:left;vertical-align:top;" |Party
! style="background-color:#E9E9E9;text-align:right;" |Votes
! style="background-color:#E9E9E9;text-align:right;" |%
|-
|style="background-color: " |
|align=left|Konstantin Zatulin (incumbent)
|align=left|United Russia
|209,512
|61.75%
|-
|style="background-color: " |
|align=left|Nikolay Borovkov
|align=left|Communist Party
|42,572
|12.55%
|-
|style="background-color: " |
|align=left|Murat Dudarev
|align=left|New People
|16,657
|4.91%
|-
|style="background-color: " |
|align=left|Aleksandra Bakina
|align=left|Liberal Democratic Party
|11,851
|3.49%
|-
|style="background-color: " |
|align=left|Vitaly Lukyanov
|align=left|A Just Russia — For Truth
|11,098
|0.33%
|-
|style="background:"| 
|align=left|Sergey Minin
|align=left|Communists of Russia
|8,958
|2.64%
|-
|style="background-color: " |
|align=left|Yelena Fisenko
|align=left|Yabloko
|7,913
|2.33%
|-
|style="background-color: " |
|align=left|Daniil Zhakin
|align=left|Party of Pensioners
|7,105
|2.09%
|-
|style="background-color: " |
|align=left|Samvel Bagiryan
|align=left|Rodina
|6,870
|2.02%
|-
|style="background-color: " |
|align=left|Yevgeny Barinov
|align=left|Civic Platform
|5,668
|1.67%
|-
|style="background:"| 
|align=left|Anna Slavgorodskaya
|align=left|Party of Growth
|5,207
|1.53%
|-
| colspan="5" style="background-color:#E9E9E9;"|
|- style="font-weight:bold"
| colspan="3" style="text-align:left;" | Total
| 339,309
| 100%
|-
| colspan="5" style="background-color:#E9E9E9;"|
|- style="font-weight:bold"
| colspan="4" |Source:
|
|}

Sources
50. Сочинский одномандатный избирательный округ

Notes

References

Russian legislative constituencies
Politics of Krasnodar Krai